Colonel Prentiss Ingraham (December 28, 1843 – August 16, 1904) was a colonel in the  Confederate Army, a mercenary throughout the 1860s, and a fiction writer.

Biography
Prentiss Ingraham, the son of Rev. Joseph Ingraham (author of A Prince of the House of David), was born near Natchez, Mississippi in Adams County. He studied at St. Timothy's Military Academy, Maryland, and at Jefferson College, Mississippi.

Later he entered the Mobile Medical College, but soon quit to join the Confederate Army where he became a Colonel in the Adacus Company Regiment. He was also commander of scouts in Lawrence Sullivan Ross' Brigade, the Texas Cavalry. After the end of the war, he went to Mexico and fought with Juárez against the French, and still later went to South America.

He had service with General Max Hoffmann's staff in the Battle of Sadowa, Austria, in 1866 was in Crete against the Turks, and in the Khedive's army in Egypt. During 1869 he went to London but soon came back to the United States and enlisted with the Cuban rebels against Spain, running the blockade in the Hornet several times before it was surrendered to the U. S. Navy. He was a Colonel in the Cuban army as well as a Captain in their navy, and was captured, tried as a filibuster and condemned to death by the Spaniards, but escaped. Ingraham relocated to the American West where he met Buffalo Bill Cody. Ingraham soon worked as an advance agent for Buffalo Bill's Wild West Show.

In 1875 he married Rose Langley.

Writing career
Ingraham's literary career began in London in 1869. He was the author of the novel The Masked Spy (1872) and is known best for his Buffalo Bill series of novels. Other major novelistic series include the Buck Taylor series, Merle Monte series, and Dick Doom series. Ingraham claimed in 1900 to have written more than 600 novels.

As well as writing by his own name, Ingraham used a number of pseudonyms including: Dr. Noel Dunbar, Dangerfield Burr, Major Henry B. Stoddard, Colonel Leon Lafitte, Frank Powell, Harry Dennies Perry, Midshipman Tom W. Hall, Lieut. Preston Graham. He also ghostwrote several works for Buffalo Bill Cody.

 Buffalo Bill dime novels by Col. Prestiss Ingraham
 1 Buffalo Bill, the Border King
 2 Buffalo Bill’s Raid
 3 Buffalo Bill’s Bravery
 4 Buffalo Bill’s Trump Card
 5 Buffalo Bill’s Pledge
 6 Buffalo Bill’s Vengeance
 7 Buffalo Bill’s Iron Grip
 8 Buffalo Bill’s Capture
 9 Buffalo Bill’s Danger Line
 10 Buffalo Bill’s Comrades
 11 Buffalo Bill’s Reckoning
 12 Buffalo Bill’s Warning
 13 Buffalo Bill at Bay
 14 Buffalo Bill’s Buckskin Pards
 15 Buffalo Bill’s Brand
 16 Buffalo Bill’s Honor
 17 Buffalo Bill’s Phantom Hunt
 18 Buffalo Bill’s Fight With Fire
 19 Buffalo Bill’s Danite Trail
 20 Buffalo Bill’s Ranch Riders
 21 Buffalo Bill’s Death Trail
 22 Buffalo Bill’s Trackers
 23 Buffalo Bill’s Mid-air Flight
 24 Buffalo Bill, Ambassador
 25 Buffalo Bill’s Air Voyage
 26 Buffalo Bill’s Secret Mission
 27 Buffalo Bill’s Long Trail
 28 Buffalo Bill Against Odds
 29 Buffalo Bill’s Hot Chase
 30 Buffalo Bill’s Redskin Ally
 31 Buffalo Bill’s Treasure Trove
 32 Buffalo Bill’s Hidden Foes
 33 Buffalo Bill’s Crack Shot
 34 Buffalo Bill’s Close Call
 35 Buffalo Bill’s Double Surprise
 36 Buffalo Bill’s Ambush
 37 Buffalo Bill’s Outlaw Hunt
 38 Buffalo Bill’s Border Duel
 39 Buffalo Bill’s Bid for Fame
 40 Buffalo Bill’s Triumph
 41 Buffalo Bill’s Spy Trailer
 42 Buffalo Bill’s Death Call
 43 Buffalo Bill’s Body Guard
 44 Buffalo Bill’s Still Hunt
 45 Buffalo Bill and the Doomed Dozen
 46 Buffalo Bill’s Prairie Scout
 47 Buffalo Bill’s Traitor Guide
 48 Buffalo Bill’s Bonanza
 49 Buffalo Bill’s Swoop
 50 Buffalo Bill and the Gold King
 51 Buffalo Bill, Deadshot
 52 Buffalo Bill’s Buckskin Bravos
 53 Buffalo Bill’s Big Four
 54 Buffalo Bill’s One-armed Pard
 55 Buffalo Bill’s Race for Life
 56 Buffalo Bill’s Return
 57 Buffalo Bill’s Conquest
 58 Buffalo Bill to the Rescue
 59 Buffalo Bill’s Beautiful Foe
 60 Buffalo Bill’s Perilous Task
 61 Buffalo Bill’s Queer Find
 62 Buffalo Bill’s Blind Lead
 63 Buffalo Bill’s Resolution
 64 Buffalo Bill, the Avenger
 65 Buffalo Bill’s Pledged Pard
 66 Buffalo Bill’s Weird Warning
 67 Buffalo Bill’s Wild Ride
 68 Buffalo Bill’s Redskin Stampede
 69 Buffalo Bill’s Mine Mystery
 70 Buffalo Bill’s Gold Hunt
 71 Buffalo Bill’s Daring Dash
 72 Buffalo Bill on Hand
 73 Buffalo Bill’s Alliance
 74 Buffalo Bill’s Relentless Foe
 75 Buffalo Bill’s Midnight Ride
 76 Buffalo Bill’s Chivalry
 77 Buffalo Bill’s Girl Pard
 78 Buffalo Bill’s Private War
 79 Buffalo Bill’s Diamond Mine
 80 Buffalo Bill’s Big Contract
 81 Buffalo Bill’s Woman Foe
 82 Buffalo Bill’s Ruse
 83 Buffalo Bill’s Pursuit
 84 Buffalo Bill’s Hidden Gold
 85 Buffalo Bill in Mid-air
 86 Buffalo Bill’s Queer Mission
 87 Buffalo Bill’s Verdict
 88 Buffalo Bill’s Ordeal
 89 Buffalo Bill’s Camp Fires
 90 Buffalo Bill’s Iron Nerve
 91 Buffalo Bill’s Rival
 92 Buffalo Bill’s Lone Hand
 93 Buffalo Bill’s Sacrifice
 94 Buffalo Bill’s Thunderbolt
 95 Buffalo Bill’s Black Fortune
 96 Buffalo Bill’s Wild Work
 97 Buffalo Bill’s Yellow Trail
 98 Buffalo Bill’s Treasure Train
 99 Buffalo Bill’s Bowie Duel
 100 Buffalo Bill’s Mystery Man
 101 Buffalo Bill’s Bold Play
 102 Buffalo Bill: Peacemaker
 103 Buffalo Bill’s Big Surprise
 104 Buffalo Bill’s Barricade
 105 Buffalo Bill’s Test
 106 Buffalo Bill’s Powwow
 107 Buffalo Bill’s Stern Justice
 108 Buffalo Bill’s Mysterious Friend
 109 Buffalo Bill and the Boomers
 110 Buffalo Bill’s Panther Fight
 111 Buffalo Bill and the Overland Mail
 112 Buffalo Bill on the Deadwood Trail
 113 Buffalo Bill in Apache Land
 114 Buffalo Bill’s Blindfold Duel
 115 Buffalo Bill and the Lone Camper
 116 Buffalo Bill’s Merry War
 117 Buffalo Bill’s Star Play
 118 Buffalo Bill’s War Cry
 119 Buffalo Bill on Black Panther’s Trail
 120 Buffalo Bill’s Slim Chance
 121 Buffalo Bill Besieged
 122 Buffalo Bill’s Bandit Round-up
 123 Buffalo Bill’s Surprise Party
 124 Buffalo Bill’s Lightning Raid
 125 Buffalo Bill in Mexico
 126 Buffalo Bill’s Traitor Foe
 127 Buffalo Bill’s Tireless Chase
 128 Buffalo Bill’s Boy Bugler
 129 Buffalo Bill’s Sure Guess
 130 Buffalo Bill’s Record Jump
 131 Buffalo Bill in the Land of Dread
 132 Buffalo Bill’s Tangled Clue
 133 Buffalo Bill’s Wolf Skin
 134 Buffalo Bill’s Twice Four Puzzle
 135 Buffalo Bill and the Devil Bird
 136 Buffalo Bill and the Indian’s Mascot
 137 Buffalo Bill Entrapped
 138 Buffalo Bill’s Totem Trail
 139 Buffalo Bill at Fort Challis
 140 Buffalo Bill’s Determination
 141 Buffalo Bill’s Battle Axe
 142 Buffalo Bill’s Game with Fate
 143 Buffalo Bill’s Comanche Raid
 144 Buffalo Bill’s Aerial Island
 145 Buffalo Bill’s Lucky Shot
 146 Buffalo Bill’s Sioux Friends
 147 Buffalo Bill’s Supreme Test
 148 Buffalo Bill’s Boldest Strike
 149 Buffalo Bill and the Red Hand
 150 Buffalo Bill’s Dance with Death
 151 Buffalo Bill’s Running Fight
 152 Buffalo Bill in Harness
 153 Buffalo Bill Corralled
 154 Buffalo Bill’s Waif of the West

Death
Prentiss Ingraham spent his final days at the Beauvoir Confederate Home in Biloxi, Mississippi where he died of Bright's Disease, known to modern medicine as nephritis, on August 16, 1904, aged 60.

References

External links

 
 
 
 

1843 births
1904 deaths
19th-century American novelists
19th-century American male writers
American male novelists
Deaths from nephritis
Dime novelists
People from Natchez, Mississippi
People from Biloxi, Mississippi
Confederate States Army officers
Jefferson College (Mississippi) alumni
Western (genre) writers